Lester O. Begick (February 17, 1926 – December 7, 1991) was an American businessman and politician.

Begick was born in Bay City, Bay County, Michigan and graduated from Michigan State University in 1950. He served in the United States Army Reserve and was commissioned a colonel. Begick was the owner of the Begick Nursery and Garden Center in Bay City. Begick served in the Michigan House of Representatives in 1961 and 1962 and then served in the Michigan Senate in 1963 and 1964. He was a Republican.

References

1926 births
1991 deaths
Politicians from Bay City, Michigan
Businesspeople from Michigan
Military personnel from Michigan
Republican Party Michigan state senators
Republican Party members of the Michigan House of Representatives
20th-century American politicians